Aptheker is a surname. Notable people with the surname include: 

Bettina Aptheker (born 1944), American political activist, radical feminist, professor and author
Herbert Aptheker (1915–2003), American Marxist historian and political activist
Aptheker v. Secretary of State, US Supreme Court case